The 2006 LSU Tigers football team represented Louisiana State University in the college football season of 2006–2007. The team was coached by Les Miles. It played its home games at Tiger Stadium in Baton Rouge, Louisiana.  The team won a bid to play in the Bowl Championship Series Allstate Sugar Bowl at the Louisiana Superdome in New Orleans, playing No. 11 Notre Dame on January 3, 2007.

Previous season
2005 was a successful season under first year head coach Les Miles.  He led the team to an 11–2 record and an appearance in the SEC championship game despite the distractions caused by Hurricane Katrina.

Pre-season
The 2006 LSU Tigers football team was ranked in the top 10 in the country by multiple publications and were expected to compete for the SEC championship.

Schedule

Honors

Game summaries

UL-Lafayette

This game was the Season opener for Tigers. The game was being played in front of the home crowd in Death Valley.  Last years season opener was a 35 to 31 win for the tigers. LSU V UL-Lafayette, Already five minutes into the game LSU had a 14–0 lead off an offensive drive down field and a defensive turnover. From this point on, LSU rolled on to win the game 45 to 3.

Arizona

This game was broadcast around the nation on ESPN2. This game was played at home. The game was over when JaMarcus Russell threw his first TD of the night late in the first quarter to make it 17–0 LSU.

The LSU defense limited Arizona to 156 total yards and recovered four Wildcats turnovers. Arizona's third-down efficiency was only one of the Wildcats problems in Baton Rouge.

Auburn

Last year LSU pulled it out against Auburn, beating them 20 to 17 in overtime. This was a game between No. 3 Auburn and No. 6 LSU. This was the first away game for the Tigers, and it would be controversial one. LSU came into the game with a string of 14 quarters without allowing a touchdown, they also came in with the best defense in the country. It would go down to the last play of the game. This game would have two elements: two punishing defenses, a pivotal officials' call that left both sides a bit perplexed and some follies in the kicking game.

With LSU facing fourth-and-8 from Auburn's 31 and 2:43 left, JaMarcus Russell fired the ball to Early Doucet near the goal line. A diving Eric Brock deflected the pass, but Zach Gilbert was called for pass interference that would have kept the drive alive.

The officials overturned the call, although replays showed the contact came before the ball was tipped by Brock. On the whole, there were anywhere between 5 and 8 questionable calls against LSU, and LSU fans felt cheated by the outcome, giving this game the nickname Grand Theft Auburn.

The Tigers drove to Auburn's 24 with 2.5 seconds left as Russell hooked up with Craig Davis for gains of 20 and 21 yards and Dwayne Bowe for 21. On the final play, Russell went to Davis again. The receiver caught the pass inside the 10, but Brock stopped him cold with a jarring hit at the 4.

"It was a low throw on the final play, but it was not JaMarcus' fault", Davis said. "I was expecting it to be a jump ball in the end zone."

Underscoring the physical nature of the game, the two teams combined for less than 2 yards a rush on 61 combined carries.

Tulane

LSU brought Tulane's 14-game span away from New Orleans to a merciless and painful end.

Early Doucet caught two touchdown passes and ran for a third score as the No. 9 Tigers jumped out to a large early lead in a 49–7 victory over Tulane on Saturday night.

Mississippi State

9 LSU would take on Mississippi State in Baton Rouge. The game would take place at 11:30 am CST.

JaMarcus Russell, who orchestrated the Tigers' 48–17 throttling of the Bulldogs, finished with three TDs on 18-for-20 passing and 327 yards.

Mississippi State put the ball on the ground, but they didn't move it forward. On 20 rushing attempts, the Bulldogs gained just 24 total yards.

Florida

It was over when JaMarcus Russell pass was intercepted by Tony Joiner of Florida with 3:00 left in the game.

Kentucky

Fresno St.

There was a lot of excitement when this game was scheduled because Fresno State had been a top 25 team the previous season.  In fact, they took No. 1 USC down to the wire and almost beat them.  For this reason, ESPN decided to telecast this game nationally.  Unfortunately, Fresno State underperformed this season and LSU took advantage of this early and often, winning 38–6.

Tennessee

LSU QB JaMarcus Russell threw a touchdown pass with 9 seconds remaining to give the LSU Tigers a 28–24 victory over Tennessee.  The Vols looked good at times during the game, but could not make a stop on LSU's final drive of the game, which consumed 7:14 from the clock.  QB Erik Ainge, starting with a sore ankle, was replaced in the 1st quarter by redshirt freshman Jonathan Crompton.  Crompton performed well for his first significant action, connecting on two long touchdown passes to Robert Meachem.  On Defense,  Tennessee intercepted Russell 3 times and recovered 1 fumble.

Alabama

Ole Miss

Arkansas

The No. 9 ranked LSU Tigers final regular season game was in Little Rock, Arkansas against the No. 5 ranked Arkansas Razorbacks. The Razorbacks only loss to this point of the season was a 50–14 defeat at the hands of the No. 3 ranked USC Trojans. LSU lead most of the game holding a 14–12 half time lead, but in the fourth quarter Arkansas made their push. With 10:31 remaining in the fourth quarter Darren McFadden scored on an 80-yard touchdown run to cut the LSU lead to 24–19. LSU responded with a 92-yard kickoff return by Trindon Holliday. Holliday's kick return proved to be the difference in a 31–26 LSU win.

Sugar Bowl

    
    
    
    
    
    
    
    
    

In a game that was advertised as a battle between the nations top-2 quarterbacks (LSU QB JaMarcus Russell vs. ND QB Brady Quinn), Russell and the LSU Tigers made sure the praise was one-sided. Russell set career high marks for yardage and TD's (3) before sealing a 41–14 victory. Russell would use this to springboard himself to the top of the 2007 draft boards as he was selected number 1 over by the Oakland Raiders, while Quinn, a hopeful number 1 overall pick himself, fell all the way to the Cleveland Browns at pick 22.

LSU Tigers in the 2007 National Football League Draft 

https://www.pro-football-reference.com/draft/2007.htm

References

LSU
LSU Tigers football seasons
Sugar Bowl champion seasons
LSU Tigers football